The silky Oldfield mouse (Thomasomys bombycinus) is a species of rodent in the family Cricetidae.
It is found only in Colombia.

References

Musser, G. G. and M. D. Carleton. 2005. Superfamily Muroidea. pp. 894–1531 in Mammal Species of the World a Taxonomic and Geographic Reference. D. E. Wilson and D. M. Reeder eds. Johns Hopkins University Press, Baltimore.

Thomasomys
Endemic fauna of Colombia
Mammals of Colombia
Mammals described in 1925
Taxonomy articles created by Polbot